K. Ponmudi (born Deivasigamani K, 19 August 1950) is an Indian Tamil politician and the current Minister for Higher Education of Tamil Nadu. He was the Minister for Higher Education of Tamil Nadu from 2006 to 2011. He was born in T. Edaiyar in the Villupuram district. He has a bachelor's degree in law, a master's degree in history, political science and public Administration and a doctorate in political science. He is an alumnus of Annamalai University. Before entering professional politics, he was a professor in the Villupuram government college. He has been elected to the Tamil Nadu assembly five times. From 1989 to 1991 during Dravida Munnetra Kazhagam rule he was the Minister for Health, and from 1996 to 2001 he was the Minister for Transport and Highways. He authored a book titled Dravidian Movement in India and Black Movement in the U.S.A.

Electoral results

References 

Dravida Munnetra Kazhagam politicians
Tamil Nadu ministers
Living people
1950 births
Annamalai University alumni
Tamil Nadu MLAs 1989–1991
Tamil Nadu MLAs 1996–2001
Tamil Nadu MLAs 2001–2006
Tamil Nadu MLAs 2006–2011
Tamil Nadu MLAs 2016–2021
Tamil Nadu MLAs 2021–2026